B cell scaffold protein with ankyrin repeats 1 is a protein that in humans is encoded by the BANK1 gene.

Function

The protein encoded by this gene is a B-cell-specific scaffold protein that functions in B-cell receptor-induced calcium mobilization from intracellular stores. This protein can also promote Lyn-mediated tyrosine phosphorylation of inositol 1,4,5-trisphosphate receptors. Polymorphisms in this gene are associated with susceptibility to systemic lupus erythematosus. Alternative splicing results in multiple transcript variants. [provided by RefSeq, Oct 2009].

References

Further reading